St. Antony's Church, is a church in Kerala, India.

Parish Profile 

Name: St. Antony Church
Parish: Kodanad
Place: Kodanad
Dioces Name: Ernakulam - Angamaly Archeparchy 
Address: Koovappady
Pin: 683 544
State/Region: Kerala
Web: http://www.smcim.org/church/kodanad

History
The Church was built in 1986 by Pidiyencheril Family after finding the statue of St. Antony's from the river. The Pidiyencheril family was former Jewish family converted to Catholic Christian after the miraculous power of the St Anthony's statue. Then the family made a Church in the name of St. Anthony.

Who is St Antony
Anthony of Padua, O.F.M. (born Fernando Martins de Bulhões; 15 August 1195 – 13 June 1231), also known as Anthony of Lisbon, was a Portuguese Catholic priest and friar of the Franciscan Order. Though he died in Padua, Italy, he was born and raised in a wealthy family in Lisbon. Noted by his contemporaries for his forceful preaching and expert knowledge of scripture, he was the second-fastest canonized saint (after St. Peter of Verona)  and proclaimed a Doctor of the Church on 16 January 1946. He is also the patron saint of finding things or lost people.

Churches in Ernakulam district
Syro-Malabar Catholic church buildings
Eastern Catholic churches in Kerala